Pseudahrensia todarodis is a Gram-negative, non-spore-forming, aerobic, rod-shaped and non-motile bacterium from the genus of Pseudahrensia which has been isolated from the gut of the squid Todarodes pacificus from the Sea of Japan.

References

External links
Type strain of Pseudahrensia todarodis at BacDive -  the Bacterial Diversity Metadatabase

Hyphomicrobiales
Bacteria described in 2016